Thomas Ryan Byrne (February 4, 1923 – March 30, 2014) was an American historian, economist, career diplomat and United States Ambassador. He received a doctorate in history and a master's degree in economics at Georgetown University.

He later worked in the US Foreign Service as a diplomat.

Ambassador 
From 1973 to 1976 Byrne was the United States Ambassador to the Kingdom of Norway. He presented his credentials as an Ambassador to King Olav V of Norway on October 4, 1973, and served in office in Oslo until April 10, 1976.

After the stationing in Norway, he moved to Prague where he was the United States Ambassador to the Czechoslovak Socialist Republic from June 1976 until November 1978.

References 

1923 births
2014 deaths
Georgetown University Graduate School of Arts and Sciences alumni
Ambassadors of the United States to Norway
Ambassadors of the United States to Czechoslovakia
People from Teaneck, New Jersey
Economists from New Jersey
United States Foreign Service personnel
Historians from New Jersey